Church and 16th Street station is a light rail stop on the Muni Metro J Church line, located in the Castro neighborhood of San Francisco, California. The station opened with the line on August 11, 1917. The station has two side platforms in the middle of Church Street (traffic islands) where passengers board or depart from trains. The stop is not accessible to people with disabilities.

In March 2014, Muni released details of the proposed implementation of their Transit Effectiveness Project (later rebranded MuniForward), which included a variety of stop changes for the J Church line. No changes were proposed for the 16th Street stop. One early-implementation item – red transit-only lanes from the 16th Street platforms northwards – was installed in March 2013 while the rest of the project was still in planning.

References

External links 

SFMTA – Church St and 16th St inbound and outbound
SFBay Transit (unofficial) – Church St & 16th St

Muni Metro stations
Castro District, San Francisco
Railway stations in the United States opened in 1917